Zdravko Logarušić (born 21 October 1965) is a Croatian football manager and the current manager of Saudi Arabian club Al-Batin. He was the manager of the Zimbabwe national team from January 2020 to September 2021.

Overall, he has coached in four continents: Europe, Asia, Oceania and North America and has more than 20 years of coaching experience.

From 1999 to 2001, Logarušić studied did coaching courses and programs in order to get a UEFA Pro License.

Managerial career

Gor Mahia
Chosen as Gor Mahia boss in 2012, he vowed to end the clubs 18-year wait to win the Premier League trophy.

For winter 2012, Logarušić went to his native Croatia for a holiday and was expected to be back for the pre-season training before the new season. However, in another holiday in the summer, he went to Croatia again but stayed there much longer than expected (he was supposed to have been back by 18 June) without informing the Gor Mahia board about the situation; he was relieved of his duties in June 2013 after he returned. In his defense, Logarušić demurred that he did not have a work permit and lived in Nairobi on a tourist visa. Secondly, he raised issue about his evident lack of  formal contract with the Nairobi-based team. Female fans criticized the board for his dismissal shortly after as well.

Simba
After leaving Kenya, Logarušić was offered a relatively high salary from Simba SC to coach them and took the offer. When he got Simba SC good results, the Tanzanian outfit bought him a house overlooking the beachfront. Unfortunately, he could not speak Swahili which hindered him from communicating fluently with the Tanzanian press. Half a year later, his contract was cancelled. Logarušić demanded TSh 3.6 million from Simba SC as requital for the club unprocedurally cancelling his contract. Still, the club refused to pay him as they said the amount charged was too exorbitant and that he had made a wrongful claim.

AFC Leopards and Asante Kotoko
Back in 2015, the well-traveled coach was selected as coach for AFC Leopards of the Kenyan Premier League. Afterward, he parted ways with them when he sent a text message to them stating that he quit the club as 'he was forced to go back to Croatia because no one was taking care of his rent' and that he was evicted from his apartment.

A year later, ahead of the 2017 Ghanaian Premier League, he was appointed boss of Asante Kotoko which was the third time he managed in Ghana. To incentivize him, the Ghanaian side bestowed a new car on him a month into the new season. As Asante Kotoko's manager, he invariably used the 3-5-2 formation which exasperated the fans. Using that formation, he got them ten points in four games and temporarily placed them second in the table. Fired by Asante Kotoko in April 2017 after winning five out of eleven games, Logarušić labelled the Asante Kotoko management as 'liars'.

Sudan
Logarušić became manager of the Sudan national team in December 2017. He was removed from the position on 30 November 2019.

Zimbabwe
On 29 January 2020, Logarušić was appointed coach of the Zimbabwe national team. In March 2021, Logarušić guided the Warriors to their fifth Africa Cup of Nations qualification.

On 12 September 2021 Logarušić was dismissed by the Zimbabwean FA following a poor string of results. A loss to Ethiopia
and a goalless draw against South Africa in the 2022 World Cup qualifiers saw pressure mounting on the local football body to take action after getting just one win out of his 14 games with the national team.

Al-Batin
On 19 February 2023, Logarušić was appointed as manager of Saudi Arabian club Al-Batin following the sacking of Alen Horvat.

References

1962 births
Living people
People from Slavonski Brod
Croatian football managers
NK Marsonia managers
King Faisal Babes F.C. managers
Ashanti Gold S.C. managers
Gor Mahia F.C. managers
Simba S.C. managers
A.F.C. Leopards managers
G.D. Interclube managers
Asante Kotoko S.C. managers
Sudan national football team managers
Zimbabwe national football team managers
Al Batin FC managers
Ghana Premier League managers
Saudi Professional League managers
Croatian expatriate football managers
Expatriate football managers in Sweden
Croatian expatriate sportspeople in Sweden
Expatriate football managers in Germany
Croatian expatriate sportspeople in Germany
Expatriate soccer players in Australia
Croatian expatriate sportspeople in Australia
Expatriate football managers in Ghana
Croatian expatriate sportspeople in Ghana
Expatriate football managers in Kenya
Expatriate football managers in Tanzania
Expatriate football managers in Angola
Expatriate football managers in Sudan
Croatian expatriate sportspeople in Sudan
Expatriate football managers in Zimbabwe
Expatriate football managers in Saudi Arabia
Croatian expatriate sportspeople in Saudi Arabia